Johannes Kahrs (born 15 September 1963) is a former German politician of the Social Democratic Party (SPD) who served as a member of the German parliament, Deutscher Bundestag, from 1998 until 2020.

Early life and education 
Kahrs was born in Bremen. His parents are Wolfgang and Bringfriede Kahrs who were both senators in Bremen on the ticket of the Social Democratic Party of Germany. After visiting school in Bremen, Kahrs joined the Bundeswehr and became an officer. Later, he began to study German jurisprudence. During his university studies, Kahrs became a member of Wingolfs, a student fraternity, in Hamburg and was speaker of the organization from 1990 to 1992.

After he finished university, Kahrs worked for the state-owned housing company Siedlungs-Aktiengesellschaft Altona (SAGA). Kahrs is openly gay.

Political career 

Kahrs became a member of the Social Democratic Party of Germany in 1982. He first worked for the Young Socialists in the SPD (Jusos). In 1992 Kahrs stood before trial because of the imputation of harassment against a female political rival in the "Jusos". He was sentenced to pay a penalty of 800 euros.

In the 1998 elections, Kahrs was first elected to the Bundestag, representing the Hamburg-Mitte constituency.

During his first term between 1998 and 2002, Kahrs served on the Defence Committee. Since 2002, he has been a member of the Budget Committee and the Audit Committee. In addition, he joined the parliament's Council of Elders in 2002, which – among other duties – determines daily legislative agenda items and assigns committee chairpersons based on party representation. From 2018 until 2020, he chaired the so-called Confidential Committee (Vertrauensgremium) of the Budget Committee, which provides budgetary supervision for Germany's three intelligence services, BND, BfV and MAD.

In addition to his committee assignments, Kahrs served as member of the German-Turkish Parliamentary Friendship Group, first as deputy chairman (2003–2011) and then as chairman (2011–2013). From 2014, he was also a deputy chairman of the Parliamentary Friendship Group for Relations with the States of the Southern Caucasus (Armenia, Azerbaijan, Georgia).

Within his parliamentary group, Kahrs led the Bundestag group of SPD parliamentarians from Hamburg from 2009. In this capacity, he was part of the parliamentary group's leadership under its successive chairs Thomas Oppermann (2013–2017), Andrea Nahles (2017–2019), and Rolf Mützenich (2019–2020). He was also the speaker of the Seeheim Circle.

In the negotiations to form a Grand Coalition of Chancellor Angela Merkel's Christian Democrats (CDU together with the Bavarian CSU) and the SPD following the 2013 German elections, Kahrs was part of the SPD delegation in the working group on banking regulation and the Eurozone, led by Herbert Reul and Martin Schulz.

In 2015, Kahrs served on the supervisory board of the Bewerbungsgesellschaft Olympia 2024 GmbH, the agency in charge of Hamburg's unsuccessful bid for the 2024 Summer Olympics.

Kahrs resigned from his mandate and all political positions on 5 May 2020.

Other activities

Corporate boards 
 KfW, Member of the Board of Supervisory Directors

Non-profit organizations 
 Business Forum of the Social Democratic Party of Germany, Member of the Political Advisory Board (since 2018)
 Helmut Schmidt Foundation, Member of the Board of Trustees (since 2017)
 Friedrich Ebert Foundation (FES), Member
 Rebuild and Relief International (RRI), Member of the Supervisory Board
 German Association for Defense Technology (DWT), Member of the Presidium
 Association of the German Army (FKH), Member of the Presidium
 German Military Reserve Association, Member
 German-Azerbaijani Forum, Member of the Board of Trustees
 Tarabya Academy, Member of the Advisory Board
 Otto von Bismarck Foundation, Member of the Board of Trustees
 Haus Rissen, Member of the Board of Trustees
 Jewish Museum Berlin, Alternate Member of the Board of Trustees
 Jugend gegen AIDS, Member of the Advisory Board
 Lesbian and Gay Federation in Germany (LSVD), Member
 German National Committee for Monument Preservation (DNK), Member
 Reichsbanner Schwarz-Rot-Gold, Member
 FC St. Pauli, Member
 German United Services Trade Union (ver.di), Member
 Magnus Hirschfeld Foundation, Member of the Board of Trustees (2011–2019)

Political positions 
Kahrs is a proponent of an accession of Turkey to the European Union.

Controversy 
In 1992, Kahrs had a power struggle with Juso member Silke Dose in which he threatened her by calling her phone anonymously at nights. He was identified by a trap installed by the police and was asked to resign from all posts by 50 members of his party but stayed on after paying a fine.

He is known for receiving substantial political donations from the arms industry and for being the center of a political network in Hamburg politics which has allegedly used its power to hinder and promote careers in a way that many journalists have called inappropriate.

References

External links 
 Personal website of Kahrs
 Biography of Kahrs by German Bundestag
 Biography on the website of the SPD

1963 births
Living people
Politicians from Bremen
Members of the Bundestag for Hamburg
Gay politicians
LGBT members of the Bundestag
Recipients of the Cross of the Order of Merit of the Federal Republic of Germany
German LGBT politicians
Members of the Bundestag 2017–2021
Members of the Bundestag 2013–2017
Members of the Bundestag 2009–2013
Members of the Bundestag 2005–2009
Members of the Bundestag 2002–2005
Members of the Bundestag 1998–2002
Members of the Bundestag for the Social Democratic Party of Germany